The Matthew effect of accumulated advantage, Matthew principle, or Matthew effect is the tendency of individuals to accrue social or economic success in proportion to their initial level of popularity, friends, wealth, etc. It is sometimes summarized by the adage "the rich get richer and the poor get poorer". The term was coined by sociologists Robert K. Merton and Harriet Zuckerman in 1968 and takes its name from the Parable of the Talents in the biblical Gospel of Matthew.

The Matthew effect may largely be explained by preferential attachment, whereby wealth or credit is distributed among individuals according to how much they already have. This has the net effect of making it increasingly difficult for low ranked individuals to increase their totals because they have fewer resources to risk over time, and increasingly easy for high rank individuals to preserve a large total because they have a large amount to risk.

The study of Matthew effects were initially focused primarily on the inequality in the way scientists were recognized for their work. However, Norman W. Storer, of Columbia University, led a new wave of research. He believed he discovered that the inequality that existed in the social sciences also existed in other institutions.

Etymology

The concept is named according to two of the parables of Jesus in the synoptic Gospels (Table 2, of the Eusebian Canons).

The concept concludes both synoptic versions of the parable of the talents:

The concept concludes two of the three synoptic versions of the parable of the lamp under a bushel (absent in the version of Matthew):

The concept is presented again in Matthew outside of a parable during Christ's explanation to his disciples of the purpose of parables:

Sociology of science
In the sociology of science, "Matthew effect" was a term coined by Robert K. Merton to describe how, among other things, eminent scientists will often get more credit than a comparatively unknown researcher, even if their work is similar; it also means that credit will usually be given to researchers who are already famous.  For example, a prize will almost always be awarded to the most senior researcher involved in a project, even if all the work was done by a graduate student.  This was later formulated by Stephen Stigler as Stigler's law of eponymy – "No scientific discovery is named after its original discoverer" – with Stigler explicitly naming Merton as the true discoverer, making his "law" an example of itself.

Merton furthermore argued that in the scientific community the Matthew effect reaches beyond simple reputation to influence the wider communication system, playing a part in social selection processes and resulting in a concentration of resources and talent.  He gave as an example the disproportionate visibility given to articles from acknowledged authors, at the expense of equally valid or superior articles written by unknown authors.  He also noted that the concentration of attention on eminent individuals can lead to an increase in their self-assurance, pushing them to perform research in important but risky problem areas.

Examples

Experiments manipulating download counts or bestseller lists for books and music have shown consumer activity follows the apparent popularity.

 A  model for career progress quantitatively incorporates the Matthew Effect in order to predict the distribution of individual career length in competitive professions. The model predictions are validated by analyzing the empirical distributions of career length for careers in science and professional sports (e.g. Major League Baseball). As a result, the disparity between the large number of short careers and the relatively small number of extremely long careers can be explained by the "rich-get-richer" mechanism, which in this framework, provides more experienced and more reputable individuals with a competitive advantage in obtaining new career opportunities.
 In his 2011 book The Better Angels of Our Nature: Why Violence Has Declined, cognitive psychologist Steven Pinker refers to the Matthew Effect in societies, whereby everything seems to go right in some, and wrong in others. He speculates in Chapter 9 that this could be the result of a positive feedback loop in which reckless behavior by some individuals creates a chaotic environment that encourages reckless behavior by others. He cites research by Martin Daly and Margo Wilson showing that the more unstable the environment, the more steeply people discount the future, and thus the less forward-looking their behavior.
 A large Matthew effect was discovered in a study of science funding in the Netherlands, where winners just above the funding threshold were found to accumulate more than twice as much funding during the subsequent eight years as non-winners with near-identical review scores that fell just below the threshold.

 In science, dramatic differences in the productivity may be explained by three phenomena: sacred spark, cumulative advantage, and search costs minimization by journal editors. The sacred spark paradigm suggests that scientists differ in their initial abilities, talent, skills, persistence, work habits, etc. that provide particular individuals with an early advantage. These factors have a multiplicative effect which helps these scholars succeed later. The cumulative advantage model argues that an initial success helps a researcher gain access to resources (e.g., teaching release, best graduate students, funding, facilities, etc.), which in turn results in further success. Search costs minimization by journal editors takes place when editors try to save time and effort by consciously or subconsciously selecting articles from well-known scholars. Whereas the exact mechanism underlying these phenomena is yet unknown, it is documented that a minority of all academics produce the most research output and attract the most citations.

Education
In education, the term "Matthew effect" has been adopted by psychologist Keith Stanovich and popularised by education theorist Anthony Kelly to describe a phenomenon observed in research on how new readers acquire the skills to read. Effectively, early success in acquiring reading skills usually leads to later successes in reading as the learner grows, while failing to learn to read before the third or fourth year of schooling may be indicative of lifelong problems in learning new skills.

This is because children who fall behind in reading would read less, increasing the gap between them and their peers. Later, when students need to "read to learn" (where before they were learning to read), their reading difficulty creates difficulty in most other subjects. In this way they fall further and further behind in school, dropping out at a much higher rate than their peers.

In the words of Stanovich:
This effect has been used successfully in legal cases, such as Brody v. Dare County Board of Education. Such cases argue that early education intervention is essential for disabled children, and that failing to do so negatively impact those children.

Network science 
In network science, the Matthew effect is used to describe the preferential attachment of earlier nodes in a network, which explains that these nodes tend to attract more links early on. "Because of preferential attachment, a node that acquires more connections than another one will increase its connectivity at a higher rate, and thus an initial difference in the connectivity between two nodes will increase further as the network grows, while the degree of individual nodes will grow proportional with the square root of time." The Matthew Effect therefore explains the growth of some nodes in vast networks such as the Internet.

Markets with social influence 
Social influence often induces a rich-get-richer phenomenon where popular products tend to become even more popular.
An example of the Matthew Effect's role on social influence is an experiment by Salganik, Dodds, and Watts in which they created an experimental virtual market named MUSICLAB. In MUSICLAB, people could listen to music and choose to download the songs they enjoyed the most. The song choices were unknown songs produced by unknown bands. There were two groups tested; one group was given zero additional information on the songs and one group was told the popularity of each song and the number of times it had previously been downloaded.

As a result, the group that saw which songs were the most popular and were downloaded the most were then biased to choose those songs as well. The songs that were most popular and downloaded the most stayed at the top of the list and consistently received the most plays. 
To summarize the experiments findings, the performance rankings had the largest effect boosting expected downloads the most. Download rankings had a decent effect; however, not as impactful as the performance rankings. 
Also, Abeliuk et al. (2016) proved that when utilizing “performance rankings”, a monopoly will be created for the most popular songs.

See also

 Attention inequality
 Capital accumulation
 Convergence
 Google Scholar effect
 The internal contradictions of capital accumulation
 Lindy effect
 Matilda effect
 Metcalfe's law
 Pareto distribution
 Positive feedback
 Preferential attachment
 
 Social network analysis
 Virtuous circle and vicious circle
 Wealth concentration

References

Further reading

 
 Cunningham, A. E., & Chen, Y.–J. (2014). Rich-get-richer effect (Matthew Effects). In P. Brooks & V. Kempe (Eds.), Encyclopedia of Language Development. New York: Sage.
 Rigney, Daniel (2010). The Matthew Effect: How Advantage Begets Further Advantage. Columbia University Press.
 
 Stanovich, Keith E. (2000). Progress in Understanding Reading: Scientific Foundations and New Frontiers. New York: Guilford Press.nningham, A. E., & Chen, Y.–J. (2014). Rich-get-richer effect (Matthew Effects). In P. Brooks & V. Kempe (Eds.), Encyclopedia of Language Development. New York: Sage.

Adages
Sociological terminology
1968 neologisms
Gospel of Matthew